The Adar House is a historic house outside Sulphur Springs, Benton County, Arkansas.

Description and history 
It is a two-story American Foursquare house with Classical Revival detailing, including a wraparound porch supported by Classical columns with an entablature, and a modillioned cornice under the roof. Built in 1897, it is a somewhat flamboyant expression of late Victorian styles for a rural setting.

The house was listed on the National Register of Historic Places on March 25, 1988.

See also
National Register of Historic Places listings in Benton County, Arkansas

References

Houses on the National Register of Historic Places in Arkansas
Houses completed in 1897
Houses in Benton County, Arkansas
National Register of Historic Places in Benton County, Arkansas
American Foursquare architecture
1897 establishments in Arkansas
Neoclassical architecture in Arkansas